The 2006 Estonian Figure Skating Championships were held at the Premia Jäähall in Tallinn from December 9 through 11th, 2005. Skaters competed in the disciplines of men's singles, ladies' singles, pair skating, ice dancing, and synchronized skating on the senior and junior levels.

The senior compulsory dance was the Yankee Polka and the junior compulsory dance was the Quickstep.

This was the last National Championships to use the 6.0 scoring system.

Senior results

Ladies

Pairs

Ice dancing

Junior results

Men

Ladies

Pairs

Ice dancing

Synchronized

External links
 2006 Estonian Championships results

Figure Skating Championships
2005 in figure skating
Estonian Figure Skating Championships, 2006
Estonian Figure Skating Championships